John J. Lombardi (born April 30, 1952) is an American Democratic politician from Providence, Rhode Island. As President of the Providence City Council, he served as acting mayor for four months between the conviction of Buddy Cianci and the election of David Cicilline.

Lombardi grew up in Federal Hill on DePasquale Avenue and graduated from Mount Pleasant High School in 1970. He attended Rhode Island College, earning a Bachelor of Arts in 1975. He worked as a teacher, earning a Master of Arts in Secondary Education from Rhode Island College in 1982, before turning his interests to law. He received a Juris Doctor from Suffolk University Law School in 1987.

In 1984, he was elected to the Providence City Council, representing Ward 13.

In 1999, Lombardi was elected President of the City Council, and served until 2006. When Vincent Cianci was convicted and was forced to step down, Lombardi, as City Council President, took over.

Since 1984, he has represented Ward 13, consisting of the neighborhoods of Federal Hill and West End.

Lombardi lost the 2010 Democratic mayoral primary to Angel Taveras, finishing second with 29% of the vote to Taveras's 48%.

In 2012, Lombardi won a three-way race to represent the neighborhoods of Federal Hill, Manton and Olneyville in the Rhode Island House of Representatives.

In 2013, Lombardi introduced a bill calling for term limits for members of the State Legislature.

2020 DCYF Legislation
In February 2020, Lombardi joined State Representative Ray Hull in introducing a bill to create a DCYF legislative oversight commission.

External links
 Biography – Rhode Island House of Representatives

References 

1952 births
Mayors of Providence, Rhode Island
Democratic Party members of the Rhode Island House of Representatives
Suffolk University Law School alumni
Rhode Island College alumni
Living people
Providence City Council members
21st-century American politicians